Darrel Treece-Birch (born 21 January 1967, in Fleetwood, England is an English hard rock/progressive rock keyboard player and songwriter, best known for his work with the Melodic Hard Rock band Ten, as a solo artist and up until 2020, with the progressive rock band, Nth Ascension.

Biography
Darrel Treece-Birch started playing keyboards from an early age. Inspired by the early electronica music of Oxygene and Equinox of Jean-Michel Jarre and the ambient orchestration of Vangelis, he soon got involved in various bands, with the most notable one being the Fleetwood-based Purple on the Storm.

Darrel Treece-Birch was a founding member of the northwest English progressive rock band Nth Ascension (originally formed as Nth Degree in 2010). In 2011, the band released their first studio album under the name Nth Ascension, entitled Frequencies of Day & Night, which was issued as a free download via the Aurovine website. Late 2012 saw the addition of a fifth member, a full time bass player. The second studio album by Nth Ascension entitled Ascension of Kings, was released in late 2014 via Sonic Vista Music to much critical acclaim. Nth Ascension's third album In Fine Initium was released in October 2016 on Melodic Revolution Records garnering much international attention from reviewers and fans. Nth Ascension released the album Stranger than Fiction under their own label Metatronic Records on 31 May 2019. In March 2021, Darrel Treece-Birch officially left Nth Ascension.

Darrel Treece-Birch joined the melodic hard rock Band Ten in 2011, with whom he has released eight studio albums so far, 2012's Heresy and Creed, 2014's Albion, 2015's Isla De Muerta and EP The Dragon and Saint George, 2016's compilation album Battlefield – The Rocktopia Records Collection, 2017's Gothica, 2018's Illuminati and 2022's Here Be Monsters.

Darrel Treece-Birch is an accomplished solo artist who was signed to US label MRR in 2015 to January 2019, and released four studio albums with Melodic Revolution Records, including Celestial a two-part digital only release in October 2015, his critically acclaimed album No More Time, August 2016 (which included guest appearances by several of his colleagues and former bandmates from Ten, Nth Ascension and Counterparts UK), Healing Touch (where he composed, performed, played all instruments, mixed, mastered and produced the work including the original painting for the artwork) October 2017 and finally in December of 2018 releasing his digital only instrumental album The first step...is to take one.

2018 was a record year for Treece-Birch releasing an album with Ten: Illuminati, guesting on Signal Red's Under The Radar, (Steve Grocott's band (guitarist - Ten)), producing, mixing, mastering and performing on Michael-Alan Taylor's (vocalist -Nth Ascension) album Avalonia: The Sonnets of Guinevere, and releasing his album The first step ... is to take one in addition to recording his final album with Nth Ascension.

In 2021 Darrel performed as guest musician for Gary Hughes’ new solo album Waterside in which he played keyboards and acoustic drums. He also created and produced the sleeve/booklet art for both Waterside and the double-album best of compilation titled "Decades" also by Gary Hughes and released by Frontiers Records. In October 2021, Treece-Birch performed on the debut studio album entitled Prophecy by the British melodic Hard Rock band TAO.
As of 2022, Treece-Birch has been working on several solo projects and the upcoming fifteenth studio album by Ten.

Discography

With Ten
 Heresy and Creed (2012)
 Albion (2014)
 Isla De Muerta (2015)
 The Dragon And Saint George EP (2015)
 Battlefield – The Rocktopia Records Collection' (2016)
 Gothica (2017)
 Illuminati (2018)
 Opera Omnia: The Complete Works (2019)
 Here Be Monsters (2022)

With Gary Hughes
 Waterside (2021)

With Nth Ascension
 Frequencies of Day & Night (2011)
 Ascension Of Kings (2014)
 In Fine Initium (2016)

As Darrel Treece-Birch
 Celestial  (2015) Released by Melodic Revolution Records - 2 October 2015 - EAN MRRCD22118
 No More Time (2016) Released by Melodic Revolution Records - 19 August 2016 - EAN MRRCD22129
 Healing Touch (2017) Released by Melodic Revolution Records - 27 October 2017 - EAN MRRCD22146The first step...is to take one (2018) Released by Melodic Revolution Records - 14 December 2018 EAN MRRDM201164

 Guest appearances 
Signal Red (Under The Radar) released 2018
Michael-Alan Taylor (Avalonia: The Sonnets of Guinevere) 2018
Signal Red (Alien Nation) released 2020
TAO (Prophecy) released 2021
Scar For Life (Sociophobia) released 2022
Tony Mitchell (Kiss Of The Gypsy'') releasing September 2021

Solo Live performances 
St. Annes International Kite Festival (St. Annes by the Sea, UK) August 2018

References

English rock keyboardists
People from Fleetwood
Living people
1967 births